William Henry Forbes (1815 – July 20, 1875) was an American fur trader and territorial legislator.

Born in Montreal, Quebec, Canada, Forbes settled in Wisconsin Territory in 1837. In 1847 he moved to what is now Saint Paul, Minnesota, where he became postmaster. Forbes worked for the American Fur Company, St. Paul Outfit. Forbes then served on the Minnesota Territorial Council 1849–1853. During the Dakota War of 1862, Forbes served in the United States Army as a quartermaster and commissary. He served as county auditor for Ramsey County, Minnesota. In 1871, he served as Indian agent for the Devil's Lake Agency, now the Spirit Lake Tribe. He died in Devil's Lake Agency in 1875 and was buried in St. Paul, Minnesota. His father-in-law was Alexander Faribault, who also served in the Minnesota Territorial Legislature.

Notes

1815 births
1875 deaths
Pre-Confederation Canadian emigrants to the United States
Politicians from Saint Paul, Minnesota
People of Minnesota in the American Civil War
Dakota War of 1862
United States Indian agents
Businesspeople from Saint Paul, Minnesota
County officials in Minnesota
Members of the Minnesota Territorial Legislature
19th-century American politicians
19th-century American businesspeople